Pre-1A is a grade in the Jewish day school structure of education, mainly in New York, that is the equivalent of Kindergarten in the United States.

Instruction 
In Pre-1A, students learn to read and write Hebrew, as well as read and write English. Because it influences Jewish students' future successes in their educational careers, many students are required to retake Pre-1A if they fail it.

Early childhood education
Early childhood education in the United States
0
Jewish education in the United States